Sir George Beaumont, 4th Baronet (c. 1664 – 9 April 1737) of Stoughton Grange, Leicestershire was a British Tory politician who sat in the English and British House of Commons for 35 years from 1702 to 1737.

Beaumont was a younger son of Sir Henry Beaumont, 2nd Baronet and his wife Elizabeth Farmer, daughter of George Farmer. He matriculated at New College, Oxford on 9 February 1683, aged 18, and graduated with a Bachelor of Civil Law in 1690 then became a fellow. In the same year he succeeded his older brother Thomas as baronet. In 1713, he was awarded the degree of a Doctor of Civil Law by the University of Oxford.

Beaumont was initially reluctant to enter parliament. However at the first general election of 1701  he allowed himself to be put forward for Oxford University by a group of younger dons. He withdrew before the poll, but when a vacancy arrived shortly afterwards in March he was re-adopted and stood at the by-election. Although defeated, he succeeded in attracting a respectable following. At the second 1701 election he campaigned with a fellow Tory, John Verney, for  Leicestershire but stood down before the poll.  At the 1702 English general election, he was selected  to stand for  Leicester and was returned as Member of Parliament in a contest. He was re-elected at the 1705 English general election, and was returned unopposed in 1708 and 1710. In 1712, he was appointed a Commissioner of the Privy Seal. He was returned unopposed for Leicester at the 1713 general election and in 1714 was appointed a Lord of the Admiralty, a post he held only for six months. He was returned again as MP for Leicester in 1715, 1722, 1727 and 1734.

Beaumont died unmarried and childless.  He was buried at Stoughton, Leicestershire and was succeeded in the baronetcy by his younger brother Lewis. His memorial was sculpted by Peter Scheemakers.

References

1660s births
1737 deaths
People from Stoughton, Leicestershire
Alumni of New College, Oxford
Baronets in the Baronetage of England
English MPs 1702–1705
English MPs 1705–1707
Members of the Parliament of Great Britain for English constituencies
British MPs 1707–1708
British MPs 1708–1710
British MPs 1710–1713
British MPs 1713–1715
British MPs 1715–1722
British MPs 1722–1727
British MPs 1727–1734
British MPs 1734–1741
Lords of the Admiralty
Tory MPs (pre-1834)